Unione Sportiva Triestina Calcio 1918, commonly referred to as Triestina, is an Italian football club based in Trieste, Friuli-Venezia Giulia. Originally founded in 1918, the club has been re-established several times in its history. As of the 2022–23 season, it plays in Serie C, the third tier of Italian football.

History

From the foundation to Serie A

The club was founded in 1918 as merger of local teams "Ponziana" and "Foot-Ball Club Trieste". The club reached Seconda Divisione (now known as Serie B) in 1924. The club successively featured in the first-ever Serie A season in 1929, and played consecutively to the Italian top flight until 1956. During those successful times, the team also featured the likes of local Trieste native Nereo Rocco, who played as winger for Triestina from 1930 to 1937, becoming also the first player from the team to become part of the Azzurri squad (in 1934). Successively, Rocco returned to Triestina as a head coach in 1947, and completed the 1947–48 as Serie A runners-up, only behind Torino; this is still, as of today, the best result in history for the Trieste-based club.

Rocco then left in 1950 to be replaced by Hungarian coach Béla Guttman, who managed to save the club from relegation only in the final matchday. Another struggling season followed in 1951–52, with Triestina escaping relegation only after winning playoffs against Lucchese and Brescia. During the 1952–53 season, Cesare Maldini made his Serie A debut as a Triestina jersey. In 1953 Rocco returned to Triestina, but was sacked after 21 matchdays due to poor results. Three more mid-table seasons followed before Triestina suffered its first relegation in 1957. Successively, Triestina returned to Serie A in 1958, but were relegated in their first comeback season, which is also their last top flight campaign to date.

The club were successively relegated to Serie C in 1961 once, in 1965 twice, and even Serie D in 1971, forcing the alabardati to a local derby with "Ponziana" in 1975. The club returned to Serie C in 1976, and was admitted to Serie C1 in 1978, and finally returned to Serie B in 1983, missing promotion to the top flight for a few seasons before being relegated in 1988. Triestina also played in second level between 1962–1965 and 1989–1991.

The first refoundation in 1994
In 1994, the team was forced to fold, because of financial insolvency, and was re-founded by Giorgio Del Sabato. The team restarted as U.S. Triestina Calcio from Serie D and was readmitted to Serie C2 by the federation one year later. In 2001, after six seasons in Serie C2, the club won promotion to Serie C1 after playoffs; this was followed by a second consecutive promotion, this time to Serie B, both under head coach Ezio Rossi.

In the 2005–06 season, Triestina changed its manager five times. The list include the tandem Alessandro Calori-Adriano Buffoni, Pietro Vierchowod, caretaker Francesco De Falco, youth team coach Vittorio Russo and Andrea Agostinelli.

In addition, Triestina's owner Flaviano Tonellotto was forced to resign on 1 February 2006 by the magistrates because of a pending court procedure for bankruptcy, and his wife Jeannine Koevoets was named to replace him at the helm of the club. However, Tonellotto was successively ordered to leave the association because of financial troubles. The magistrates named Francesco De Falco as caretaker chairman with the idea of finding somebody interested to buy the club. Curiously, in the 2005–06 De Falco, a player for Triestina in the 80's, covered three different roles in the club: director of football, manager and chairman. In April 2006 the team was purchased by the Fantinel family, owners of a wine company in the region.

In recent years, Triestina struggled to mount a promotion campaign to end half-century absence from the Italian top flight. Triestina finished 8th in 2008–2009 season. However failed to remain in Serie B in the 2009–10 season, with a crashing 3–0 defeat to Padova at the play-outs, and was relegated to Lega Pro Prima Divisione after 8 years of endeavour in the second tier of Italian football, only to be readmitted to Serie B after Ancona filed for bankruptcy.

On 21 May 2011, in the season 2010–11, after a disastrous campaign, Triestina was relegated from Serie B to Lega Pro Prima Divisione, having returned there in 2002 after 11 seasons in Serie C and Serie D.

2012: Relegation and bankruptcy
On 25 January 2012 the club in strong financial difficulty, has been declared bankrupt by the court of Trieste.

In the season 2011–12 Triestina was relegated from Lega Pro Prima Divisione group B to Lega Pro Seconda Divisione.

On 19 June 2012 the club was finally declared bankrupt and the team was disbanded.

Stefano Mario Fantinel, former chairman of the club, was suspended from football activities for 5 years after the prosecutor found accounting irregularities of the club. In July, three more months were added due to player transfer irregularities. Fantinel was also suspended for 3 months in 2006–07 Serie B, also causing the club 1 point, for irregularities on preparing quarterly management report on 30 March 2006.

Unione Triestina 2012 / U.S. Triestina Calcio 1918
On 31 July 2012 was founded the new company Unione Triestina 2012 S.S.D.  a. r.l. that restarted from Eccellenza thanks to Article 52 of N.O.I.F. The sports title was later transferred to another "limited company in amateur sport" U.S. Triestina Calcio 1918 s.s.d. a. r.l. in 2016. After the promotion to Serie C on 4 August 2017, the company dropped the legal suffix "amateur sport" from the name.

Colors and badge
The club's badge features a white spontoon or halberd—from where the club gets the nickname Gli Alabardati (The Halberded)—on a red background. This is inspired by the coat of arms and flag of the city of Trieste. Other features of the badge include a shining white star and the words U. S. Triestina. After this badge, the team's colours both home and away are red and white.

Honours

 Serie B
 Winners: 1957–58
 Serie C1
 Winners: 1961–62, 1982–83
 Coppa Italia Serie C
 Winners: 1993–94

Divisional movements

Current squad

Out on loan

Former managers

 Rudolf Soutchek (1929–30)
 István Tóth (1930–31)
 Béla Révész (1931–32)
 Károly Csapkay (1932–34)
 István Tóth (1934–36)
 Lajos Kovács (1936–37)
 Mario Grassi (1932)
 Luis Monti (1939–40)
 Rudolf Soutchek (1940–41)
 Mario Villini (1941–42)
 Guido Testolina (1943–44)
 Mario Villini (1945–46)
 Mario Varglien (1946–47)
 Nereo Rocco (1947–50)
 Béla Guttmann (1950–52)
 Mario Perazzolo (1952–53)
 Nereo Rocco (1953)
 Severino Feruglio (1953–56)
 Piero Pasinati (1956–57)
 Aldo Olivieri (1957–59)
 Guglielmo Trevisan (1959–61)
 Vasco Tagliavini (1974–79)
 Fulvio Varglien (1979–80)
 Ottavio Bianchi (1980–81)
 Adriano Buffoni (1981–84)
 Massimo Giacomini (1984–85)
 Enzo Ferrari (1985–88)
 Marino Lombardo (1988–90)
 Massimo Giacomini (1990–91)
 Franco Veneranda (1991)
 Giuliano Zoratti (1991–92)
 Attilio Perotti (1992–93)
 Vittorio Russo (1993)
 Adriano Buffoni (1993–94)
 Franco Pezzato (1994–95)
 Giorgio Roselli (1995–97)
 Adriano Lombardi (1997)
 Giuseppe Marchioro (1997–98)
 Paolo Beruatto & Giuseppe Dossena (1998)
 Paolo Ferrario (1998–99)
 Andrea Mandorlini (1999)
 Maurizio Costantini (1999–2000)
 Ezio Rossi (2000–03)
 Attilio Tesser (2003–05)
 Adriano Buffoni & Alessandro Calori (2005)
 Pietro Vierchowod (2005)
 Francesco De Falco (2005)
 Vittorio Russo (2005–06)
 Andrea Agostinelli (2006–07)
 Franco Varrella (2007)
 Rolando Maran (2007–09)
 Luca Gotti (2009)
 Mario Somma (2009–10)
 Daniele Arrigoni (2010)
 Ivo Iaconi (2010)
 Sandro Salvioni (2010–11)
 Massimo Pavanel (2011)
 Gian Cesare Discepoli (2011)
 Giuseppe Galderisi (2011–12)
 Fabio Sambaldi (2012)
 Maurizio Costantini (2012–13)
 Fabio Rossitto (2013–14)
 Stefano Lotti (2014)
 Giuseppe Ferazzoli (2014–15)
 Gianluca Gagliardi (2015)
 Cristiano Masitto (2015)
 Stefano Lotti (2015)
 Elio Roncelli (2015)
 Paolo Doardo (2015–16)
 Roberto Bordin (2016)
 Antonio Andreucci (2016–17)
 Giuseppe Sannino (2017–18)
 Nicola Princivalli (2018)
 Massimo Pavanel (2018–2019)
 Nicola Princivalli (2019)
 Carmine Gautieri (2019–2020)
 Giuseppe Pillon (2020–2021)
 Cristian Bucchi (2021–2022)
 Andrea Bonatti (2022)
 Massimo Pavanel (2022-2023)
 Augusto Gentilini (2023-present)

References

External links

 

 
Football clubs in Italy
Football clubs in Friuli-Venezia Giulia
Sport in Trieste
Association football clubs established in 1918
Serie A clubs
Serie B clubs
Serie C clubs
Serie D clubs
Eccellenza
1918 establishments in Italy
Phoenix clubs (association football)
1994 establishments in Italy
2012 establishments in Italy
Coppa Italia Serie C winning clubs